Memories of My Melancholy Whores is a novella by Gabriel García Márquez. The book was originally published in Spanish in 2004, with an English translation by Edith Grossman published in October 2005.

Plot
An old journalist, who has just celebrated his 90th birthday, seeks sex with a 14-year-old prostitute, who is selling her virginity to help her family. Instead of sex, he discovers love for the first time in his life.

List of characters 
First-person narrator - Unidentified old journalist.
Rosa Cabarcas - Brothel owner and pimp.
Delgadita - 14-year-old virgin girl.
Florina de Dios Cargamantes - Narrator's mother.
Damiana - Narrator's maid.
Ximena Ortiz - Narrator's fiancée .
Jerónimo Ortega - Journal chief censor.
Editor-in-chief.
J.M.B.- Famous banker.
Sacramento Montiel - Brothel owner.
Casilda Armenta - Former prostitute.
Castorina - Prostitute with whom the narrator had his sexual debut.
Narrator's angora cat.

Adaptation

In 2012, a joint film production of the novel by Spain, Denmark and Mexico was released by Danish film director, Henning Carlsen, and starring Emilio Echevarría, Olivia Molina, Ángela Molina and Geraldine Chaplin. The film received the Special Young Jury Prize at the Malaga Spanish Film Festival.

References

External links 
 Complete Review review
 Fantastic Fiction page
 Film Based on Gabriel Garcia Marquez Book Prompts Protest in Mexico by The Los Angeles Times
 'The Nonagenarian and the Nymphette', review in the Oxonian Review

2004 Colombian novels
Colombian novellas
Colombian novels adapted into films
Novels by Gabriel García Márquez
Novels about Colombian prostitution
Colombian magic realism novels
Alfred A. Knopf books